Midori is a free and open-source web browser. In 2019, the Midori project merged with the Astian Foundation, then Midori was revamped entirely, switching from WebKitGTK to using Electron.

History 
Before the merge, Midori was a different browser. It was a lightweight web browser, used the WebKitGTK rendering engine and the GTK widget toolkits. This past Midori was part of the Xfce desktop environment's Goodies component and was once developed to follow the Xfce principle of "making the most out of available resources". It was the default browser in the SliTaz Linux distribution, Trisquel Mini, Artix Linux, old versions of Raspbian, and wattOS in its "R5 release". It was the default browser in elementary OS "Freya" and "Luna", and Bodhi Linux. It featured:
 Support for integration with GTK2 and GTK3
 WebKitGTK rendering engine
 Tabs, windows and session management
 Configurable web search engine
 User scripts and user styles support
 Bookmark management
 Customizable and extensible interface
 Extension modules can be written in C and Vala
 Support for HTML5
 DuckDuckGo as a default search engine
 Internationalized domain names support
 Smart bookmarks
 Extensions
Adblock
 Form history
 Mouse gestures
 Cookie management
 RSS Feed panel
 Maemo integration for mobile devices
 Speed dial
 'Next Page' feature
 Support for Ubuntu Unity
 Private browsing
 Tab backup for the next session by default Midori was part of the standard Raspbian distribution for the Raspberry Pi ARMv6-based computer, while Dillo and NetSurf are also in the menu. Midori is being packaged with Manjaro Linux and Trisquel Mini as their default web browser as well and it even was the default web browser in elementary OS and Bodhi Linux at one time.
Midori passed standard compliance Acid3 test.
In March 2014, Midori scored 405/555 on the HTML5 test.
In July 2015, Midori 0.5 on Windows 8 scored 325/555 on the updated HTML5 test.

The former Midori was recommended by Lifehacker due to its simplicity. The major points for criticism are the absence of the process isolation, the low number of available extensions and occasional crashes.

Nick Veitch from TechRadar included Midori 0.2.2 in his 2010 list of the eight best web browsers for Linux. At that time he rated it as "5/10" and concluded, "while it does perform reasonably well all-round, there is no compelling reason to choose this browser over the default Gnome browser, Epiphany, or indeed any of the bigger boys".

Himanshu Arora of Computerworld reviewed Midori 0.5.4 in November 2013 and praised the browser's speed and uncluttered interface, while additionally underlining the private browsing which uses a separate launch icon and displays the details of this mode on the home tab.

Victor Clarke from Gigaom praised the former Midori's minimalism in 2014 and stated that it will "satisfy your humble needs without slowing down your PC", despite stressing the lack of advanced functionality.

See also 

 GNOME Web – a similar web browser based on GTK and WebKitGTK
 List of web browsers for Unix and Unix-like operating systems

References

External links

 Midori website archives on Archive.org
 Midori project on GitLab

Free software programmed in C
Free software programmed in Vala
Free web browsers
POSIX web browsers